The second season of Love Island Australia premiered on the Nine Network and 9Now on Monday, 7 October 2019 presented by Sophie Monk and narrated by Eoghan McDermott.

Format
Love Island involves a group of contestants, referred to as Islanders (in the show) living in isolation from the outside world in a villa in Fiji, constantly under video surveillance. To survive in the villa the Islanders must be coupled up with another Islander, whether it be for love, friendship or money, as the overall winning couple receives $50,000. On the first day, the Islanders couple up for the first time based on first impressions, but over the duration of the series, they are forced to "re-couple" where they can choose to remain in their current couple or swap and change.

Any Islander who remains single after the coupling is eliminated and dumped from the island. Islanders can also be eliminated via public vote, as during the series the public vote through the Love Island app available on smartphones for their favourite couple, or who they think is the most compatible. Couples who receive the fewest votes risk being eliminated. Often a twist has occurred where it has been up to the Islanders to vote one of their own off the island. During the final week, the public vote for which couple they want to win the series and therefore take home $50,000. The winners can pick between share the money ($25,000 each) or take it all depending on an envelope they open as seen in love island Australia series 1.

Islanders
The first Islanders were announced on 29 September 2019, one week before the premiere episode.

Coupling and elimination history

Notes

Series details

Weekly summary
The main events in the Love Island villa are summarised in the table below.

Australia’s Vote
Throughout the series, Australia was given the opportunity to vote to affect the islanders. This included voting for islanders to go on a date, voting to save or dump islanders from the island, and ultimately for the winner of Love Island Australia.

Ratings

Ratings
 
Notes

References

Nine Network original programming
2019 Australian television seasons
Television shows filmed in Fiji
Television shows set in Fiji